Harry Munter is a 1969 Swedish drama film directed by Kjell Grede. It was entered into the 1970 Cannes Film Festival. At the 7th Guldbagge Awards Carl-Gustaf Lindstedt won the award for Best Actor.

Cast
 Georg Adelly - Manne
 Märta Allan-Johnson - Grandma
 Gerda Calander - Kristina Birgitta Eleonor
 Inga Dahlbeck - Girl #1
 Britt Marie Engstroem - Girl #2
 Gun Jönsson - Gudrun Munter
 Carl-Gustaf Lindstedt - Valle Munter
 Marie-Louise Mark
 Jan Nielsen - Harry Munter
 Elina Salo - Lonely Woman
 Alan Simon - Mr. Burne
 Palle Westerlund - Grim

References

External links

1969 films
1969 drama films
Swedish drama films
1960s Swedish-language films
Films directed by Kjell Grede
1960s Swedish films